Bunn–Tillapaugh Feed Mill is a historic feed mill located at Richmondville in Schoharie County, New York. The main portion of the mill building is a 40 foot by 60 foot, rectangular, four story heavy timber-framed building sheathed in narrow clapboard siding.  The mill rests on a stone basement story, built into the steep bank of Bear Gulch, a tributary of Cobleskill Creek.  Located adjacent is the mill pond.

It was listed on the National Register of Historic Places in 2006.

References

Industrial buildings and structures on the National Register of Historic Places in New York (state)
Industrial buildings completed in 1885
Buildings and structures in Schoharie County, New York
National Register of Historic Places in Schoharie County, New York